The Derwent Pencil Museum is in Keswick, in the north-west of England.

History 
The museum opened in 1981 and is home to one of the biggest colouring pencils in the world, the idea of technical manager Barbara Murray.

The first pencil factory in Keswick opened in 1832. The second and current factory was started in the 1920s and completed in 1950 (it closed in 2007 when the owners moved production to Workington).

The museum now receives over 80,000 visitors a year from all around the world. It is particularly popular with visitors from the county of Yorkshire, due to the importance of pencil production for the local economy during the 1930s. The museum features as one of the locations in the 2012 film Sightseers.

Storm Desmond 
In December 2015, the museum was badly damaged by several feet of flood water when the River Greta broke its banks as a result of Storm Desmond and many artefacts were destroyed. Although many of the exhibits were salvaged, one limited-edition collection could not be replaced.

The museum reopened to the public on 15 June 2017, with Countryfile presenter John Craven cutting the ribbon..

See also 
 Derwent Cumberland Pencil Company
 Sightseers

References

External links
 Derwent Pencil Museum - official site

Museums in Cumbria
Industry museums in England
Pencils
Tourist attractions in Cumbria
Keswick, Cumbria
Industrial archaeological sites in England